Brahima Keita (born 1 January 1985) is an Ivorian footballer.

References

1984 births
Living people
Ivorian footballers
Ivorian expatriate footballers
Association football midfielders
Expatriate footballers in Kuwait
Expatriate footballers in the United Arab Emirates
Expatriate footballers in Qatar
Footballers from Abidjan
Qadsia SC players
Al Ain FC players
Al Salmiya SC players
Al-Arabi SC (Kuwait) players
Al-Shamal SC players
Kuwait Premier League players
UAE Pro League players
Qatari Second Division players
Al-Fahaheel FC players
Ivorian expatriate sportspeople in Kuwait
Ivorian expatriate sportspeople in the United Arab Emirates
Ivorian expatriate sportspeople in Qatar
Louhans-Cuiseaux FC players
Expatriate footballers in France
Ivorian expatriate sportspeople in France